Katerina Stewart was the defending champion, but lost to Alexandra Panova in the second round.

Jennifer Brady won the title, defeating Taylor Townsend in the final, 6–3, 7–5.

Seeds

Main draw

Finals

Top half

Bottom half

References 
 Main draw

Revolution Technologies Pro Tennis Classic - Singles